Gettin' to It is the debut studio album of American jazz bassist Christian McBride. The album was released in 1995 via Verve label.

Background
The album was produced by Richard Seidel and Don Sickler, and released by Verve Records on 1 September 1994. Although this was McBride's first solo album, he had previously featured on records as a sidesman for Gary Bartz on the album Shadows, Benny Green on Greens, Roy Hargrove on Public Eye, Joe Henderson on Lush Life: The Music of Billy Strayhorn, Freddie Hubbard on Live at Fat Tuesday's, Joe Lovano on Tenor Legacy, Harold Mabern on Lookin' on the Bright Side,  and Joshua Redman on Joshua Redman. Redman and Hargrove appear on Gettin' to It as instrumentalists. The record features 10 tracks and a total running time of 55 minutes and 34 seconds.

Reception
Howard Reich of Chicago Tribune noted "That Christian McBride is one of the most appealing and accomplished young bass players to come along in years must be obvious to anyone who has heard him accompany Roy Hargrove, Freddie Hubbard and other stars. Now McBride is stepping into the spotlight with his first recording as leader. Though the music isn't particularly adventurous, it celebrates jazz tradition with a technical brilliance, a rhythmic vigor and a sonic warmth that are uniquely McBride's." Jeff Levenson of Billboard commented "Gettin' To It is not a typical bass player's album. McBride is not showcased in a flamboyant manner, nor is he placed front and center , overshadowing his bandmates. His presence and authority, however, are unmistakable, from the radio-friendly funk of the title track to his solo tour de force on "Night Train,' to the uplifting treatment of "Splanky," on which McBride proves himself the descendant of trio mates and spiritual godfathers Milt Hinton, age 84, and Ray Brown, 68". Tony Scherman of Entertainment Weekly added "Christian McBride has a big, fat tone and limitless dexterity, and the music boils (especially a choice piece of funk called ”In a Hurry”), but everything feels a little antiseptic — this isn’t, after all, a working band, just a one-shot convocation of hired guns".

Track listing

Personnel
Band
Christian McBride – bass
Roy Hargrove – trumpet, flugelhorn
Joshua Redman – tenor saxophone
Steve Turre – trombone
Cyrus Chestnut – piano
Lewis Nash – drums
Ray Brown & Milt Hinton – bass on "Splanky"

Production
Richard Seidel & Don Sickler – production
Jim Anderson – recording

Chart performance

References

External links
 Christian McBride Discography
 

Christian McBride albums
1995 debut albums
Verve Records albums